The Subic Bay Metropolitan Authority (abbreviated as "SBMA") is a governmental agency of the Philippines. Sometimes abbreviated as SBMA, the agency has played a significant part in the development of the Subic Bay Freeport and the Special Economic Zone into a self-sustainable area that promotes the industrial, commercial, investment, and financial areas of trade in the zone as well as in the country of the Philippines itself.

The area of jurisdiction of SBMA includes the erstwhile U.S. Naval Base Subic Bay, parts of Redondo peninsula where the Subic Hanjin shipyard is located, and erstwhile US defence accommodations in the hills consisting of Binictican and Kalayan housing areas.

The SBMA is currently headed by former City Mayor of Olongapo Rolen Paulino as of March 1, 2022. His predecessor as Chairman and Administrator from 2017 to 2022 was lawyer and public affairs manager of Philip Morris Fortune Tobacco Company Inc. (PMFTC) Wilma T. Eisma.

History 
On March 13, 1992, the Philippine Congress passed Republic Act 7227, known as the Bases Conversion and Development Act of 1992, in anticipation of the pullout of the US military bases in the country. Section 13 of Republic Act No. 7227 created the Subic Bay Metropolitan Authority (SBMA) to develop and manage the Freeport which provides tax and duty-free privileges and incentives to business locators in the special economic zone.

Richard Gordon, then the mayor of the City of Olongapo, became the first SBMA chairman.

Mayor Gordon with 8,000 volunteers took over the facility to preserve and protect US$8 billion worth of property and facilities when the last U.S. Navy helicopter carrier USS Belleau Wood sailed out of Subic Bay on November 24, 1992. They started the conversion of the military base into a freeport like Hong Kong and Singapore.

On its fourth anniversary on November 24, 1996, Subic Bay hosted the leaders of 18 economies during the Fourth Asia- Pacific Economic Cooperation (APEC) Leaders' Summit. By that time, the emerging investment haven had already successfully attracted companies such as Federal Express, Enron, Coastal Petroleum (now part of Kinder Morgan), Taiwan computer giant Acer and France telecoms company Thomson SA to establish operations in the freeport.

Subic Bay Historical Center
The Authority opened a history center. It has an exhibit about hell ships, and other recoveries in Subic Bay's maritime history.

List of SBMA Chairman and Administrators

References

Government agencies under the Office of the President of the Philippines
Government-owned and controlled corporations of the Philippines
Politics of Olongapo
Politics of Zambales
Politics of Bataan
Government agencies established in 1992
Subic Special Economic and Freeport Zone